Sirpa Kukkonen (born 7 December 1958 in Tervo) is a Finnish ski-orienteering competitor and World Champion. 

Kukkonen won a silver medal in the relay, with teammates Sinikka Kukkonen and Mirja Puhakka, and a bronze medal in the individual event at the 1982 World Ski Orienteering Championships.

At the 1988 World Championships she won a gold medal in the relay with the Finnish team, with Anne Benjaminsen and Virpi Juutilainen, and also bronze medals in both the long course and in the short course.

See also
 Finnish orienteers
 List of orienteers
 List of orienteering events

References

Finnish orienteers
Female orienteers
Ski-orienteers
1958 births
Living people